The Razzie Award for Worst Director is an award presented at the annual Golden Raspberry Awards to the worst director of the previous year. The following is a list of nominees and recipients of that award, along with the film(s) for which they were nominated.

Winners and Nominees

1980s

1990s

2000s

2010s

2020s

Multiple winners
2 wins
Michael Bay
John Derek
M. Night Shyamalan

Multiple nominations

6 nominations
Michael Bay
Renny Harlin

5 nominations
Brian De Palma
  
4 nominations
Dennis Dugan
M. Night Shyamalan
   
3 nominations
John G. Avildsen
Uwe Boll
John Derek
James Foley
John Landis
Hal Needham
Tyler Perry

2 nominations
Steven Brill
Michael Cimino
Bob Clark
Bill Condon
Kevin Costner
Jan de Bont
Blake Edwards
Roland Emmerich
Jason Friedberg
Ron Howard
Roland Joffé
George Lucas
Prince
Aaron Seltzer
Sylvester Stallone
Oliver Stone
Lana Wachowski
Lilly Wachowski
Keenen Ivory Wayans

References

Golden Raspberry Awards by category
Film directing awards